Mexican dry forest describes a number of  ecoregions of Mexico within the dry broadleaf forest Biome.
Together they constitute a World Wildlife Fund Global 200 priority ecoregions area for conservation.

Ecoregions
The area includes the dry forest ecoregions of Mexico's Pacific Ocean Coast from Sinaloa and the southern Baja California peninsula south to Guatemala.

North to south, they include:
Jalisco dry forests
Balsas dry forests
Bajío dry forests
 Chiapas Depression dry forests
Sonoran-Sinaloan transition subtropical dry forest, 
Southern Pacific dry forests
 Sinaloan dry forests
 Sierra de la Laguna dry forests.

See also
 Ecoregions of Mexico

References and external links
 Mexican dry forests (National Geographic)
 World Wildlife Fund & C.Michael Hogan. 2011. Jalisco dry forests. Encyclopedia of Earth, National Council for Science and the Environment, Washington DC. eds M.McGinley and C.J.cleveland

.
Forests of Mexico
Neotropical ecoregions
Tropical and subtropical dry broadleaf forests